Coricidin, Coricidin 'D' (decongestant), or Coricidin HBP (for high blood pressure), is the name of an over-the-counter cough and cold drug containing dextromethorphan (a cough suppressant) and chlorpheniramine maleate (an antihistamine). Introduced by Schering-Plough in 1949 as one of the first antihistamines, it is now owned by Bayer. Varieties of Coricidin may also contain acetaminophen (an analgesic/antipyretic) and guaifenesin (an expectorant).

Medicinal use
Coricidin is used to alleviate common cold symptoms such as coughs and congestion. Other versions of Coricidin are used to reduce fever or as an expectorant, while Coricidin HBP includes chlorpheniramine for people with high blood pressure. Side effects can include diarrhea and hallucination.

Recreational use

Coricidin, in its cough & cold formulation, is sometimes used in high doses as a recreational drug because it contains the dissociative dextromethorphan. In this context, Coricidin is referred to as Cs, Red Devils (Red Ds), Triple Cs, Skittles, trips, or china red.

Use in popular music

In the late 1960s, blues-rock guitarist Duane Allman began using an empty glass Coricidin bottle as a guitar slide, finding it to be just the right size and shape for this purpose. Allman started to play slide guitar when he received two birthday gifts from his brother, Gregg: a copy of Taj Mahal's debut album, with its version of "Statesboro Blues", and a bottle of Coricidin pills (as Duane had a cold that day). Other prominent slide guitarists, such as Derek Trucks (a later member of the Allman Brothers Band), Ray Wylie Hubbard, Rory Gallagher, J. D. Simo, and Gary Rossington also adopted the Coricidin bottle as a slide.

Notes

External links

Combination drugs
Schering-Plough brands
Merck & Co. brands
Bayer brands